Simon Mark Guy (born 17 November 1978 in Rotherham, South Yorkshire, England) is an English first-class cricketer, who played for Yorkshire until his release by the county in August 2009.

He has played thirty seven first-class matches as a wicket-keeper, taking 98 catches and twelve stumpings, and as a right-handed batsman averages 16.13. He fell ill in February 2009 with a cerebral abscess, and required an emergency operation which led to him being hospitalised for six weeks which meant he missed Yorkshire's pre-season tour to Dubai and Sharjah. However he returned to first team action three months later in May, playing in a Friends Provident Trophy game for Yorkshire. He played for Darlington C.C. in 2009 and Marske C.C. in 2010 as club professional in the North Yorkshire and South Durham Cricket League.

He has attracted media attention for pioneering a new form of protective face-gear, dubbed the "Hannibal mask", the after character Hannibal Lecter from the film The Silence of the Lambs.

Guy comes from a cricketing family, with his two brothers playing competitive league cricket in Yorkshire. His father has represented Nottinghamshire and Worcestershire Second XI's and turned down the opportunity to sign professional terms for Worcestershire in the late 1960s.

Having parted company with Yorkshire in 2009, he returned briefly to their ranks in 2011, to cover for a player shortage, playing in a County Championship Roses match against Lancashire in May that year.

References

External links
Cricket Online Profile

1978 births
Living people
English cricketers
Yorkshire cricketers
Cricketers from Rotherham
Suffolk cricketers
Wicket-keepers